Twelve nations are to compete in the 2023 World Baseball Classic qualification.

Pool A

Manager  Pavel Chadim

Coaches Joe Truesdale, John Hussey, Alex Derhak, David Winkler

Manager  Bruce Bochy
Coaches Joe Bochy, Tom Levasseur, Keino Pérez, Boris Rothermundt, Steve Smith

Manager  Steve Janssen
Coaches Kris van Deuren, Troy Williams, Simon Walters, Shawn Roof, Bernard Beckman

Manager  Drew Spencer
Coaches Albert Cartwright, Zach Graefser, TS Reed, Brad Marcelino, Conor Brooks, Alan Dean, Jesse Guffey

Manager  Nelson Prada
Coaches Nestor Pérez, Juan Rincón, Candelario Díaz, Félix Cano, Manuel Olivera

Manager  Andy Berglund
Coaches Neil Adonis, Jody Birch ,  Kevin Johnson, Corey Lee, Erick Threets

Pool B

Manager  Rolando Arnedo
Coaches Marcelo Alfonsin, Eduardo Capdevila, Gabriel Sansó, Nicholás Solari

Manager  Steve Finley
Coaches Luis Alicea, Jose Thiago Caldeira, Marcos Guimaraes, LaTroy Hawkins

Manager  Scott Campbell
Coaches Brian Anderson, Darren Bragg, Brian Matusz, Daniel Tan, Al Quintana

Manager  Marvin Benard
Coaches Sandor Guido, Cairo Murillo, Henry Roa, Yader Roa

Manager
 Syed Fakhar Ali Shah
CoachesMiah Rafique Choudhury, Peter Durkovic, Jobie Anderson, Wayne Arms, Manzar Shah

Manager  Luis Ortiz
Coaches Len Picota, Julio Rangel, Hipólito Ortiz, Vicente Garibaldo

References

External links
Official website

Rosters